Deh Now Pirjed (also Romanized as Deh Now Pīrjed) is a village in Kakasharaf Rural District, in the Central District of Khorramabad County, Lorestan Province, Iran. At the 2006 census, its population was 762, in 169 families.

References 

Towns and villages in Khorramabad County